Lobster Lake in the North Maine Woods was named because its shape resembles the outline of a lobster claw. The larger eastern arm of the lake extending southward is Big Claw and a smaller western arm is Little Claw. Lobster Lake and the river are at a similar elevation; so the West Branch may temporarily reverse flow through Lobster Stream into the lake during peak runoff events from the western Maine highlands along the Canadian border. The lake has self-sustaining populations of native lake trout and land-locked Atlantic salmon; but brook trout populations are suppressed by competition from yellow perch and white perch.

Sources

Lakes of Piscataquis County, Maine
North Maine Woods
Penobscot River
Lakes of Maine